Rita Casadio is a Professor of Biochemistry at the University of Bologna.

Career
Her work in machine learning has been used for protein structure prediction and methods from her group have been highly ranked in international competitions, such as the Critical Assessment of protein Structure Prediction (CASP) and the Critical Assessment of Function Annotation (CAFA).

Awards and honours
She was elected a Fellow of the International Society for Computational Biology (ISCB) in 2020 for outstanding contributions to the fields of computational biology and bioinformatics.

See also
ELIXIR

References

External links

Living people
Italian bioinformaticians
Academic staff of the University of Bologna
Year of birth missing (living people)
21st-century women scientists
Women biochemists
Computational biologists
Women computational biologists